Johnny Winter (1944–2014) was an American rock and blues musician.  From 1959 to 1967, he recorded several singles for mostly small record companies in his native Texas. In 1968, Winter completed his first album, The Progressive Blues Experiment, and in 1969, he was signed to Columbia Records. With the label, Winter had his greatest success on the main American record chart; Johnny Winter (1969), Second Winter (1969), Live Johnny Winter And (1971), and Still Alive and Well (1973) all reached the top forty on the Billboard 200 album chart. In 1974, the Recording Industry Association of America (RIAA) certified Live Johnny Winter And gold, his only record to receive an award from the organization.

Beginning in 1973, Winter's music was issued by Blue Sky Records, a Columbia custom label.  At Blue Sky, Winter also became a producer and was responsible for releases by Chicago blues pioneer Muddy Waters.  He produced Hard Again (1977), which earned Waters a Grammy Award and helped re-establish his popularity.  In the years after 1984, Winter changed record companies several times, never remaining with any one for more than three albums.  These included Alligator Records, MCA Records' Voyager subsidiary, Point Blank Records, Virgin Records, and Megaforce Records.  In 2007, he began producing a number of albums from his personal recordings, designated the "Live Bootleg Series".  Winter's last studio album, Step Back, released shortly after his death in 2014, was his most successful in the record charts since his Columbia period.  Several live albums and compilations have appeared on Billboard's "Blues Albums" specialty chart.

Throughout his career, Winter's recording catalogue was plagued by bootleg albums and unauthorized re-releases of singles from his early pre-Columbia Records days. These records competed with his official releases and some were doctored with later overdubs by other musicians. Royalties were not Winter's primary concern: "I just don't want that bullshit out... It's just bad music."

Albums

Studio albums

Live albums

Live Bootleg Series albums
The "Live Bootleg Series" are authorized, official releases produced by Winter for the Friday Music label. The CDs and LPs include the notice: "All master recordings are owned and controlled by Johnny Winter and are compiled from the authorized Johnny Winter archives". The recordings were not state-of-the-art for the time and many similar recordings had previously circulated as actual bootleg albums. The peak chart positions refer to Billboards "Blues Albums" chart (none appeared on the broader Billboard 200 album chart).

Compilation albums
After Winter signed to Columbia Records in 1969, his former associates began licensing albums consisting of Winter's early singles and demos for various labels. These 40 or so songs continue to be re-packaged and re-released by numerous small record companies.  In several interviews, Winter asserts that these were unauthorized and that some have been overdubbed with other musicians.  For completeness, two of the more noteworthy compilations of pre-1968 recordings are included.  The rest of those listed below contain songs that were recorded from 1968 on.

Singles

Albums as producer and/or guitarist
{| class="wikitable plainrowheaders" style="text-align:center;"
|+ 
! scope="col" width=5% | Year
! scope="col" width=40% | Title
! scope="col" width=40% | Details
! scope="col" width=10% | ChartpeakBillboard 200
! scope="col" width=5% | 
|-
| 1975
! scope="row" | Temple of Birth
| 
Artist: Jeremy Steig
Released: 1975
Label: Columbia (KC 33297)
Format: LP record
Note: Johnny Winter plays guitar on several tracks.
| —
| 
|-
| 1977
! scope="row" | Hard Again
| 
Artist: Muddy Waters
Released: January 10, 1977
Label: Blue Sky (PZ 34449)
Format: LP, audio cassette
Note: Winter produced the album and plays guitar; won Grammy Award for Best Ethnic or Traditional Folk Recording.
| 143
| 
|-
| 1978
! scope="row" | I'm Ready
| 
Artist: Muddy Waters
Released: February 1978
Label: Blue Sky (JZ 34928)
Format: LP, cassette, 8-track audio cartridge
Note: Winter produced the album and plays guitar, and sings on one track; won Grammy for Best Ethnic or Traditional Folk Recording.
| 157
| 
|-
|rowspan="2" | 1979
! scope="row" | Muddy "Mississippi" Waters – Live
| 
Artist: Muddy Waters
Released: January 1979
Recorded live: March 18, 1977August 26, 1978
Label: Blue Sky (JZ 35712)
Format: LP, cassette, 8-track
Note: Winter produced the album, plays guitar on several tracks, and sings backing vocals on one track; won Grammy for Best Ethnic or Traditional Folk Recording.
| —
| 
|-
!scope="row" | Blast
| 
Artist: Blast (with Ula Hedwig and Jaroslav Jakubovič)
Released: 1979
Label: Columbia (JC 36012)
Format: LP
Note: Winter plays guitar.
| —
| 
|-
| 1981
! scope="row" | King Bee
| 
Artist: Muddy Waters
Released: 1981
Label: Blue Sky (PZ 37064)
Format: LP, cassette, 8-track
Note: Winter produced the album and plays guitar.
| 192
| 
|-
| 1984
! scope="row" | Whoopin'''
| 
Artist: Sonny Terry
Released: 1984
Label: Alligator (AL 4734)
Format: LP, cassette, compact audio disc (CD)
Note: Winter produced the album and plays guitar and piano.
| —
| 
|-
| 2007
! scope="row" | Breakin' It Up, Breakin' It Down| 
Artist:  Muddy Waters, Johnny Winter, James Cotton
Released: 2007
Recorded: March 1977 (live)
Label: Epic (88697 07283 2)
Format: CD
Note: Winter plays guitar and sings on some tracks.
| —
| 
|-
| 2018
! scope="row" | Both Sides of the Sky| 
Artist: Jimi Hendrix
Released: 2018
Recorded: May 7, 1969
Label: Legacy (19075814192)
Format: CD
Note: Winter plays guitar on "Things I Used to Do" (demo).
| 8
| 
|-
|align="center" colspan="5" style="font-size: 80%"| "—" denotes a release that did not chart
|}

Concert videos

Documentary filmJohnny Winter: Down & Dirty'' is a documentary film about the life and music career of Johnny Winter.  It was directed by Greg Olliver and is 104 minutes long.  The movie premiered on March 12, 2014, at the South by Southwest Film Festival.  It was released on DVD on March 4, 2016.

Footnotes

References

Bibliography

External links
 

Rock music discographies
Discographies of American artists